Douglas Murrell Cooper, known professionally as Tim Kramer (born 1952 or 1958, died April 16, 1992) was a gay porn star, escort and health business owner best known for the 1983 homoerotic film Gayracula among his films.

Early life
Douglas Cooper was born on February 2, 1958, in Milton, Cabell County, West Virginia. Later, he attended high school in Columbus, Ohio, and upon graduation moved to Fort Dale, Florida, where he began to model for Target Studios.

Career
Later, he moved to San Francisco, where he continued his career working for Falcon Studios. Among the early films he appeared are Ship Shape and Blackout for Target Studios and Biker Liberty for Falcon Studios. During the late seventies and early eighties, he made about a dozen feature-length films including Big Summer Surprise, Style, Giants II, Gayracula, I Do, Tony's Initiation, Men of the Midway, Heroes, Trick Time, Sun Stroke, and New Zealand Undercovers.

Filmography
 Style (1981)
 Biker's Liberty (1982)
 Pegasus (1982)
 Biker's Liberty: Big Summer Surprise (1983)
 Giants II (1983)
 Gayracula (1983) 
 Men of the Midway (1983) 
 Tony's Initiation (1983) 
 I Do (1984) 
 Heroes (1984) 
 Trick Time (1984)
 Sun Stroke (1986) 
 New Zealand Undercovers (1987)
 Young Men Of The 80's 2 (2002, released posthumously)

Later life and death
In a 1988 Advocate interview, Cooper spoke openly of the escort service he ran in Hollywood for many years: "That's where I made most of the money. I don't do drugs or liquor, so I used the (film) business to build up my name, so I could charge more money on the side in my escort service." His earnings were invested in a solar installation company, and in time parlayed into a partnership with fellow skin star Ron Pearson to found Pegasus Productions. The partnership produced only one film, Pegasus which featured the founders. By the late 1980s, Cooper made fewer films and concentrated most of his energy on a health food store in West Hollywood. It was during this time he was diagnosed HIV+, and he commented thus: "I'm in a business now that's health oriented. We're an AIDS support group, promote safe sex, and are here to try and give something back to the community and help people who are HIV+ or have AIDS. So I can't be involved in unsafe sex in front of a camera, because that says it's okay. It would make me look like a hypocrite."

Kramer died on April 16, 1992, at Doctors Hospital North in Columbus, Ohio. The cause of death was listed as AIDS complications. He is buried in the Chestnut Grove Baptist Church Cemetery, Cabell County, West Virginia.

References

External links
 
 

1992 deaths
AIDS-related deaths in Ohio
American male pornographic film actors
American actors in gay pornographic films
People from Milton, West Virginia
20th-century American male actors
Year of birth uncertain